Sveta Trojica v Slovenskih Goricah is a settlement in northeastern Slovenia. It is the seat of the Municipality of Sveta Trojica v Slovenskih Goricah. It lies in the Slovene Hills. The area is part of the traditional region of Lower Styria. It is now included in the Drava Statistical Region.

Name
The name of the settlement was changed from Sveta Trojica v Slovenskih Goricah (literally, 'Holy Trinity in the Slovene Hills') to Gradišče (literally, 'fortified hillfort') in 1952. The name was changed on the basis of the 1948 Law on Names of Settlements and Designations of Squares, Streets, and Buildings as part of efforts by Slovenia's postwar communist government to remove religious elements from toponyms. The name was then changed from Gradišče to Gradišče v Slovenskih Goricah in 1953. The name Sveta Trojica v Slovenskih Goricah was restored in 1992.

Church

The local landmark is the parish church in the settlement, from which the village gets its name. It is dedicated to the Holy Trinity and belongs to the Slovenian province of the Franciscan order (OFM). It is a large Baroque church with three belfries that also appear in the municipality's coat of arms. It was built between 1636 and 1643 and expanded between 1735 and 1740. There is also a Franciscan monastery in the village.

Notable people
Notable people that were born or lived in Sveta Trojica v Slovenskih Goricah include:
Ivo Brnčić (1912–1943), writer
Boris Kraigher (1914–1967), politician, resident of the Executive Council of the Socialist Republic of Slovenia

References

External links
Sveta Trojica v Slovenskih Goricah at Geopedia

Populated places in the Municipality of Sveta Trojica v Slovenskih Goricah